Egbert C. Sammis was a state senator in Florida. He also served as consul in Stuttgart.

John S. Sammis was his father. Two of his grandparents were Anna and Zephaniah Kingsley of the Kingsley Plantation.

References

External links
Findagrave entry

Florida state senators
Year of birth missing (living people)
Living people